Stirling Road railway station served the town of Carluke, North Lanarkshire, Scotland from 1843 to 1853 on the Wishaw and Coltness Railway.

History 
The station opened as Carluke and Lanark on 8 May 1843 by the Wishaw and Coltness Railway. It had several sidings and a line that served Coltness Iron Works. The station's name was changed to Stirling Road in 1848. It closed in 1853.

References

External links 

Disused railway stations in North Lanarkshire
Railway stations in Great Britain opened in 1843
Railway stations in Great Britain closed in 1853
1843 establishments in Scotland
1853 disestablishments in Scotland
Former Caledonian Railway stations